The coal towns, or "coal camps" of Fayette County, West Virginia were situated to exploit the area's rich coal seams. Many of these towns were located in deep ravines that afforded direct access to the coal through the hillsides, allowing mined coal to be dropped or conveyed downhill to railway lines at the valley floor. Many of these encampments were set up as company towns, and when their mines closed, the towns vanished. A few, like Thurmond, West Virginia, have survived in a reduced state. Fayette County covers portions of three coalfields: the New River Coalfield, the Kanawha Coalfield and the Greenbrier Coalfield. Below is a partial list of known coal towns within  the three coalfields: the New River Coalfield, the Kanawha Coalfield and the Greenbrier Coalfield. More may be found here

New River Coalfield

 Alaska (abandoned)
 Ames
 Bachman (abandoned)
 Beury (abandoned)
 Brooklyn
 Brown (abandoned)
 Caperton (abandoned)
 Carlisle
 Claremont (abandoned)
 Clifftop (abandoned)
 Concho (abandoned)
 Cunard
 Dimmock (abandoned)
 Elmo (abandoned, later named Ames)
 Elverton (abandoned)
 Fayette (abandoned)
 Fire Creek (abandoned)
 Glen Jean
 Harvey
 Kay Moor (abandoned)
 Kilsyth
 Layland
 Lawton (abandoned)
 Lochgelly
 MacDonald
 Minden
 Mount Hope
 Newlyn  (abandoned)
 Nuttalburg (abandoned)
 Prudence
 Red Ash (abandoned)
 Red Star
 Rush Run (abandoned)
 Scarbro
 Sewell (abandoned)
 Stone Cliff (abandoned)
 Sugar Creek (abandoned)
 Summerlee
 Sun (abandoned)
 Sunnyside (abandoned)
 Thayer
 Thurmond
 Turkey Knob
 Whipple
 Wingrove

Kanawha Coalfield

 Beards Fork
 Cannelton
 Carbondale
 Collinsdale
 Eagle (abandoned)
 Elkridge
 Gamoca (abandoned)
 Harewood (abandoned)
 Ingram Branch (abandoned)
 Jodie
 Kimberly
 Kingston  (abandoned)
 Longacre (abandoned)
 Long Branch (abandoned)
 McDunn (abandoned)
 Marting (abandoned)
 Milburn (abandoned)
 Page
 Pax
 Powellton
 Vanetta (abandoned)
 Willis Branch
 Wyndal (abandoned)

Greenbrier Coalfield

 Beelick Knob
 Bellwood

References

New River Coalfield
.
Geography of Fayette County, West Virginia
Ghost towns in West Virginia